Inshes is a small residential area in the east of Inverness, Scotland. Inverness is the capital of the Highlands and is one of the fastest-growing cities in Europe. Some parts of Inshes were built a few decades ago, but most of it was built after 2003. A few houses are still being constructed and not yet finished. The houses are made by Barrat and Tulloch Homes, which are quite popular and expensive in Britain. A majority of the houses are semi-detached but some are detached. There are also a few flats in Inshes.

Education
The area has a school, Inshes Primary School, which has about 400 pupils. Secondary pupils attend Millburn Academy, which is attended by more than 1100 pupils. Inshes Primary is the latest built primary school in Inverness.

Shopping
Inshes is very close to a large shopping centre called Eastgate Shopping Centre.

References

Areas of Inverness